Sasquacapnia is a genus of small winter stoneflies in the family Capniidae. There are at least two described species in Sasquacapnia.

Species
These two species belong to the genus Sasquacapnia:
 Sasquacapnia missiona (Baumann & Potter, 2007)
 Sasquacapnia sasquatchi (Ricker, 1965)

References

Further reading

 
 

Plecoptera